Yŏnt‘an County is a county in North Hwanghae province, North Korea.

Name
The name Yontan means "a fast stream like a swallow", which refers to the river that is fast that exists in the region.

History
The county was newly created in 1952 from Myons from Hwangju County, Suan County and Sŏhŭng County.After Hwanghae Province was divided into North and south in 1954, the region became a county of North Hwanghae Province.

Administrative divisions
Yŏnt‘an county is divided into 1 ŭp (town) and 16 ri (villages):

Industry
The county currently cultivates Choke berries(called Tannamu(단나무)) since 1985(at the period of the 40th anniversary of the founding of the WPK).The region also artificially incubates eggs of Common pheasants, since the hunting of the birds were popular in the region.

Notable places
Simwonsa:Buddhist temple built in the Goryeo dynasty
Goguryeo tombs of Songjung-ri

References

Counties of North Hwanghae